Graham Walne is a prolific British born theatre consultant, lighting designer, author, and lecturer who has worked in Europe, the US and Australia where he has lived since 1998.

Early years
Walne was born in Lancashire UK in 1947. His love of theatre was stimulated at an early age by attendances at Blackpool's ornate Victorian Tower Circus where the circus ring magically filled with water, fountains and mermaids. He attended Accrington Grammar School where his aim to become a stage designer was indulged by having his own scene workshop. During this time his large-scale models of the London Palladium Theatre came to the attention of the theatre management which encouraged him to attend the Royal Academy of Dramatic Art to be trained as a stage manager by Dorothy Tenham. He graduated in 1967 and the Palladium employed him as an electrician. The productions on which Walne worked involved major international stars and were televised live on “The London Palladium Show”, a successor to “Sunday Night At The London Palladium”

Career 
After the London Palladium Walne was employed as Assistant Technical Supervisor by international lighting manufacturer Rank Strand (1970–1974), before becoming Sales Manager to Theatre Projects Services (1974).  Walne had been undertaking free-lance work during these years as a lighting designer and he went fully freelance in 1975.
He has been the project leader, or a leading partner, in over 100 theatre consultancy projects of all types and scales, 40 of them in Western Australia.  Notable projects include:
 London, Shakespeare Globe (as associate to Michael Holden)
 London, Royal Academy of Music Theatre
 Crawley UK,  Hawth Theatre
 Guernsey UK, Beau Sejour redevelopment

Western Australia:
 State Theatre Centre
 Perth Town Hall and Subiaco Arts Centre refurbishments
 Hale School and All Saints College new theatres
 Albany Entertainment Centre

He has designed the lighting for over 500 productions worldwide, notable work includes: 
 25 grand operas for the Opera Company of Boston USA
 13 ballets in repertoire for the Bolshoi Ballet at London's Royal Albert Hall
 Cabaret at London's Dorchester Hotel Park Lane and the Café Royal Regent Street
 Premiere of ‘The Balcony’ opera, Bolshoi Theatre Moscow (then USSR)
 Numerous UK tours, pantomimes and London West End seasons
 Fringe productions at the Edinburgh Festival. 
 3 productions for the Perth International Arts Festival Western Australia
 35 productions for three companies in Perth Western Australia since 1999
 Opening Gala State Theatre Centre of Western Australia.

Publications 
Walne has written over 100 articles for theatre technical publications in the US, Europe and Australia and the following books:

 Oxford Companion to the Theatre, co-author, (first ever sound section) 1983
 Sound for Theatres, 1981
 Sound for the Theatre, 1990 
 Safety in Live Performance (Training section) 1993
 Recent Safety Legislation (co-author) 1994
 Effects for the Theatre (editor and co-author) 1995
 Projection for the Performing Arts, 1995
 On Being A Lighting Designer, 2019

Other achievements 
In 1987 he co-founded and chaired for ten years the Arts and Entertainment Technical Training Initiative (aetti), the first body in the UK to deliver National Vocational Qualifications (NVQs) for backstage personnel. The later aetti restructured and delivered the first BTEC qualifications for stage technicians.

He has given numerous Masterclasses on lighting and sound in Europe, the US and Australia where he still lectures at the Western Australian Academy of Performing Arts (WAAPA). Additionally he wrote and presented what was considered (1991) the first video on stage lighting.
He was made a Fellow of the Gordon Reid Foundation (Western Australia) in 1997.
In 1999 Walne brought together five other theatre consultants working in Western Australia and together they founded the Institute of Independent Arts Consultants (WA), he was appointed the Institute's first chairman.

He is a member of the Association of Lighting Designers, and of the Association of British Theatre Technicians.

References 
 

Lighting designers
Living people
Year of birth missing (living people)